1605 papal conclave may refer to:

 March–April 1605 papal conclave, which elected Leo XI to succeed Clement VIII
 May 1605 papal conclave, which elected Paul V to succeed Leo XI